A prize court is a court (or even a single individual, such as an ambassador or consul) authorized to consider whether prizes have been lawfully captured, typically whether a ship has been lawfully captured or seized in time of war or under the terms of the seizing ship's letters of marque and reprisal.  A prize court may order the sale or destruction of the seized ship, and the distribution of any proceeds to the captain and crew of the seizing ship.  A prize court may also order the return of a seized ship to its owners if the seizure was unlawful, such as if seized from a country which had proclaimed its neutrality.

History/jurisdiction in various countries
Prize courts were common in the 17th through 19th centuries, during times of American or European naval warfare. The United States in 1780 established the Federal Court of Appeals in Cases of Capture to hear appeals of prize cases from state prize courts; this court was ended in 1787, after conclusion of the war. Due to changes in the nature of naval warfare, no prize cases have been heard since the statutes were adopted in 1956.

In England and Wales, prize jurisdiction is exercised by the Admiralty Court, part of the Queen's Bench Division of the High Court of Justice (see Prize Courts Act 1894 and Senior Courts Act 1981, ss. 20(1)(d), 27 and 62(2)), and by way of appeal to the Judicial Committee of the Privy Council.

In France, the prize council has jurisdiction to determine the issue of the prize. Since 2007, piracy has been transferred to criminal courts. The council's jurisdiction is reduced to war time. The way of appeal is open to the President of the French Republic acting as judge.

The International Prize Court was an international court proposed at the beginning of the 20th century, to hear prize cases. An international agreement, the Convention Relative to the Creation of an International Prize Court, was established at The Hague on October 18, 1907, but this was never ratified or implemented.

References

Diplomacy
Prize warfare